Parbold railway station, on the Manchester to Southport Line,  serves the village of Parbold and the nearby village of Newburgh in West Lancashire, England. It is currently operated by Northern Trains.

History 
The station was built by the Manchester and Southport Railway as a branch of the East Lancashire Railway on 9 April 1855. It radically altered the village, allowing workers to live in Parbold and commute to urban areas throughout the North West. The railway station also provided a natural centre for the village which it still is today. It was absorbed by the Lancashire and Yorkshire Railway (L&YR) in 1859. The main stone-built station building (still in use) was built during this time, in the standard L&YR style. Parbold railway station then became part of the London, Midland and Scottish Railway during the Grouping of 1923. The station then passed to the London Midland Region of British Railways on nationalisation in 1948. When Sectorisation was introduced in the 1980s, the station was served by Regional Railways until the privatisation of British Rail.  The station has retained its L&YR signal box, which operates the adjacent barrier level crossing.

In 2005 the railway station underwent a £250,000 restoration project which saw the ticket office restored to its former glory and new fences and CCTV installed.

Facilities
The station is staffed on a part-time basis, with the ticket office open from 06:30 to 11:00 on weekdays only (closed Saturdays and Sundays).  At other times, tickets must be purchased prior to travel or on the train.  Train running information can be obtained from timetable posters and by phone.  There are shelters on both platforms and step-free access is available to each one.

Name 
The station was originally named Newburgh after the nearest large village (Newburgh) but this became Newburgh for Parbold and then Parbold for Newburgh. At this point Dalton wanted to also to be mentioned in the official name so the railway company decided to just call the station Parbold (this happened before 1910 as the station was called Parbold in the Bradshaw of that date). At one point however the station was again renamed as Parbold for Newburgh (see 1960s and 1980s British Railway timetables.) Finally in 1973 the station became once again plain Parbold.

Services
On Monday to Saturday daytimes, there are two trains an hour westbound to Southport and eastbound to Wigan.

On Sundays there is an hourly service to Southport and Blackburn via  and Manchester Victoria.

References

External links

Railway stations in the Borough of West Lancashire
DfT Category E stations
Former Lancashire and Yorkshire Railway stations
Railway stations in Great Britain opened in 1855
Northern franchise railway stations
Parbold